David Graeme ( – 14 March 1726) was a Scottish politician.

He was elected at a by-election in December 1724 as the Member of Parliament (MP) for Stirlingshire, and held the seat until his death in 1726, aged about 50.

References 
 

1676 births
Year of birth uncertain
1726 deaths
Members of the Parliament of Great Britain for Scottish constituencies
British MPs 1722–1727